Manjhiaon is one of the administrative blocks of Garhwa district, Jharkhand state, India.

About Manjhiaon Garhwa Jharkhand 
Manjhiaon a Taluka/Block, close to Garhwa, is located 20  km from Garhwa. Manjhiaon is located near koel river. It's well covered by Vodafone, Airtel, Uninor, Reliance, BSNL, Aircel, Idea, and like cellular networks.

Languages
Languages spoken here include Asuri, an Austroasiatic language spoken by approximately 17 000 in India, largely in the southern part of Palamu; and Bhojpuri, a tongue in the Bihari language group with almost 40 000 000 speakers, written in both the Devanagari and Kaithi scripts.

Facilities
Market:   A small market called as  Manjhiaon bazar is situated in middle of the block.

See also
 Districts of Jharkhand
 Palamu district
 Garhwa district
 Latehar district

References

Garhwa district
Community development blocks in Jharkhand
Community development blocks in Garhwa district
Cities and towns in Garhwa district